Anju Jain (born 11 August 1974) is an Indian former cricketer and current cricket coach. She played as a wicket-keeper and right-handed batter. She appeared in eight Test matches and 65 One Day Internationals for India between 1993 and 2005. She played domestic cricket for Delhi and Air India. She previously coached India and Bangladesh, and currently coaches on the Indian domestic circuit.

Playing career
She captained India at the 2000 World Cup, where the side reached the semi-finals before losing to New Zealand.

She jointly holds the record for the most stumpings in WODIs, with 51. Jain played seven WODIs as captain, wicket-keeper and opening batter, a record.

Anju received the Arjuna Award in 2005 for her sporting achievements from then President of India Dr. APJ Abdul Kalam.

Coaching career
Since retiring, Jain has coached Odisha, Tripura, Assam, Vidarbha and Baroda at domestic level.

Between 2011 and 2013, she was the head coach of India, and between 2018 and 2020 she was the head coach of Bangladesh.

References

External links

1974 births
Living people
Cricketers from Delhi
Indian women cricketers
India women Test cricketers
India women One Day International cricketers
Indian women cricket captains
Delhi women cricketers
Air India women cricketers
Indian cricket coaches
Wicket-keepers
Recipients of the Arjuna Award